Semaphorin-3A is a protein that in humans is encoded by the SEMA3A gene.

Function 

The SEMA3A gene is a member of the semaphorin family and encodes a protein with an Ig-like C2-type (immunoglobulin-like) domain, a PSI domain and a Sema domain. This secreted Semaphorin-3A protein can function as either a chemorepulsive agent, inhibiting axonal outgrowth, or as a chemoattractive agent, stimulating the growth of apical dendrites. In both cases, the protein is vital for normal neuronal pattern development.

Semaphorin-3A is secreted by neurons and surrounding tissue to guide migrating cells and axons in the developing nervous system.  Axon pathfinding is the process by which neurons follow very precise paths, sends out axons, and react to specific chemical environments to reach the correct endpoint. The guidance is critical for the precise formation of neurons and the surrounding vasculature. Guidance cues, such as Sema3A, induce the collapse and paralysis of neuronal growth cones during development of the nervous system.

This guidance cue for axons of neurons is signaled through receptor complexes containing Neuropilin-1 (NRP1) and a co-receptor. One of the first identified intracellular messenger required for the growth cone-collapse induced by Sema3A is the CRMP protein called CRMP2.

In addition to its role in the nervous system, Sema3A also acts as an inhibitor of angiogenesis, the process by which new blood vessels develop.

Clinical significance 
The protein semaphorin-3A is highly expressed in scar tissue after traumatic central nervous system injuries, such as spinal cord injury. Semaphorin-3A, and the other class 3 semaphorins, contributes to the failure of neuronal regeneration after CNS injury by regulating axonal re-growth, re-myelination, re-vascularisation, and the immune response.

Increased expression of semaphorin-3A is associated with schizophrenia and is seen in a variety of human tumor cell lines. Also, aberrant release of this protein is associated with the progression of Alzheimer's disease.

Additionally, the terminal Schwann cells of amyotrophic lateral sclerosis (ALS) mice (SOD1 mutant) express semaphorin-3A at fast-fatigable fiber neuromuscular junctions greater than wild-type mice. This expression is greatest pre-symptomatically corresponding to ALS progression in which fast-fatigable fiber denervation precedes clinical symptoms. Because semaphorin-3A is involved in growth cone collapse, axon pruning, and repulsion, it potentially holds a causal relationship to synaptic weakening and denervation that precedes motor neuron apoptosis in ALS.

References

Further reading

External links